Wheeler Home is a historic home located at Loudonville in Albany County, New York.  It was built about 1920 and is a two-story, five bay, brick dwelling in the Georgian Revival style.  It features a balustrade along the roofline and a portico supported by two columns.

It was listed on the National Register of Historic Places in 1979.

References

Houses on the National Register of Historic Places in New York (state)
Georgian Revival architecture in New York (state)
Houses completed in 1920
Houses in Albany County, New York
National Register of Historic Places in Albany County, New York